Lisa Kennedy Montgomery (born September 8, 1972), referred to mononymously as Kennedy, is an American libertarian political commentator, radio personality, author, and former MTV VJ. She was the host of MTV's now-defunct daily late-night alternative-rock program Alternative Nation throughout much of the 1990s.

, she is the host of Kennedy on the Fox Business Network. Kennedy occasionally hosts Outnumbered on Fox News, and is a frequent panelist on that network's show The Five.

Early life
Lisa Kennedy Montgomery was born in Indianapolis, Indiana, and raised in Lake Oswego, Oregon, a suburb of Portland. Kennedy and her two brothers were raised by her mother. She is of Romanian and Scottish descent. She attended Lakeridge High School. She has a bachelor's degree in philosophy from the University of California, Los Angeles (UCLA).

Kennedy interned as a DJ at KROQ radio in Los Angeles as a teenager. She was known on KROQ as "the Virgin Kennedy".

Career
She was a VJ at MTV. As "Kennedy", she hosted Alternative Nation from 1992–1997.

In 1999, Kennedy published her book Hey Ladies! Tales and Tips for Curious Girls, in which she incorporated a multitude of personal experiences. That same year, she moved to Seattle to host The Buzz on KQBZ radio; the show was a mix of news, local issues, and comedy. Montgomery left Seattle in 2001 to cohost a morning radio show with Ahmet Zappa on the Comedy World Radio Network, The Future with Ahmet & Kennedy, a similar mix of current events and comedy. She later co-hosted a morning show with Malibu Dan, The Big House.

Beginning June 3, 2002, Kennedy hosted Game Show Network's Friend or Foe?, which ran for two seasons. On April 1, 2003, she guest-hosted the GSN show WinTuition as part of GSN's April Fools prank where hosts swap places, while the original hosts usually appear as cameos, and play as contestants in Lingo for charity. She also hosted GSN's Who Wants to Be Governor of California?, a televised debate among fringe candidates in the 2003 California gubernatorial recall election, such as actors Gary Coleman and Mary Carey.

Beginning September 23, 2005, Kennedy appeared as an occasional panelist on VH1's Best Week Ever and MSNBC's Scarborough Country. In October 2005, she became host of Fox Reality's Reality Remix until that series ended in June 2008.

In December 2007, she guest-hosted the evening show several times on Los Angeles talk-radio station KFI, before being hired by the station for a regular Sunday-afternoon show. In April 2008, she joined Bryan Suits as cohost of the Kennedy & Suits Show at that station through September 30, 2009. She hosted Music in the Mornings on KYSR in Los Angeles from 2009 until March 2014.

On January 18, 2011, she began appearing as Anthony Sullivan's assistant on PitchMen, looking for new inventions to promote in infomercials.

Kennedy joined Fox Business Network as a contributor in 2012. She co-hosted The Independents, a current-events and political discussion show, from its debut on December 9, 2013. The show was cancelled in January 2015, but she continued as host of her own program, Kennedy. Kennedy was put on hiatus March 13, 2020, due to the COVID-19 pandemic. On October 19, 2020, the program ended its seven-month hiatus.

She is also a contributor to Reason.com and Reason.tv, and occasionally serves as guest host for Bill Carroll, John and Ken, and Tim Conway Jr. on KFI. She was a correspondent on the Fox Business talk show Stossel, and made occasional appearances as a panelist and guest host on Fox News' Red Eye. She has also made appearances on other Fox talk shows, such as Outnumbered and The Five.

Politics

Kennedy is registered as unaffiliated.
She is a supporter of same-sex marriage, and officiated at the wedding of fellow Fox contributor Guy Benson to husband Adam Wise. She also supports privatization of Social Security. She opposes the "war on drugs" and bureaucratic regulation. She is critical of neoconservatism.

At MTV's 1993 Rock 'n' Roll Inaugural Ball for Bill Clinton, she chanted, "Nixon now! Nixon now!" whenever the Clintons went on stage. Along with being a fan of Richard Nixon, she supported Dan Quayle and Bob Dole. She was a speaker at the 1996 Republican National Convention.

She later abandoned social conservatism, saying, "Social conservatism was really bringing me down, and I realized, as time went on, that I wasn't a Bush conservative. I was really a libertarian." She was first introduced to libertarianism when Kurt Loder suggested she read Ayn Rand's Introduction to Objectivist Epistemology. She actively supported Gary Johnson in both the 2012 and 2016 presidential elections.

In March 2012, Reason published an article by Kennedy saying atheism is a religion on par with theistic religions.

Personal life
Kennedy is divorced from former professional snowboarder Dave Lee; the couple has two daughters.

Kennedy dated frontman and guitarist John Rzeznik from the band Goo Goo Dolls. The song "Name" was written about her.

She has the Romanian flag tattooed on her left ankle, and a pink Republican elephant tattooed on her upper left thigh.

In September 2012, during an appearance on Red Eye, Kennedy said she had been diagnosed with celiac disease, leading her to change to a more meat-based diet.

Kennedy is a triathlete.

Publications

See also
 List of people diagnosed with celiac disease

References

External links

 
 
 Reason.tv: Kennedy on Medical Marijuana, guns, alt rock and politics
 

1972 births
Living people
20th-century American people
20th-century American women
21st-century American women
American game show hosts
American libertarians
American people of Romanian descent
American people of Scottish descent
American political commentators
American television news anchors
American female triathletes
Christian libertarians
Critics of neoconservatism
Fox Business people
Fox News people
Lakeridge High School alumni
American LGBT rights activists
People from Indianapolis
People from Lake Oswego, Oregon
University of California, Los Angeles alumni
VJs (media personalities)